Pamyat was a Russian ultranationalist organization.

Pamyat may ralso efer to:
Pamyat (film), a 1971 film directed by Grigori Chukhrai
Vechnaya Pamyat, "Memory Eternal", chanted in honor of the departed in the Russian Orthodox Church